Labeo is a genus of carps in the family Cyprinidae. They are found in freshwater habitats in the tropics and subtropics of Africa and Asia.

It contains the typical labeos in the subfamily Labeoninae, which may not be a valid group, however, and is often included in the Cyprininae as tribe Labeonini. If the Labeoninae are accepted as distinct, Labeonini is the name of the tribe in this subfamily to which the labeos belong. If the Labeonini are considered a tribe of the Cyprininae, the labeos are placed in subtribe Labeoina.

The labeos appear fairly similar to the "freshwater sharks" of the genus Epalzeorhynchos, which is also part of the Labeoninae (or Labeonini), but is not very closely related. Labeos are larger, and have a more spindle-shaped body, as they are mostly free-swimming rather than benthic like Epalzeorhynchos. Their mouths look very different, too; they have a pronounced rostral cap, which covers the upper lip except when feeding. The lips are expanded into thick, sausage-shaped pads which have keratinized edges. Thus, their mouth parts are moderately apomorphic; not as little-developed as in barbs or in Epalzeorhynchos, but neither as extensive as in, for example, Garra or Ptychidio. The genus name Labeo is Latin for "one who has large lips".

Labeos have the two barbels on the rostrum which are common among the Cyprinidae, and also another pair of barbels at the rear edges of the lower maxilla, which has been lost in some of their relatives. They have a well-developed vomeropalatine organ. In the Weberian apparatus, the posterior supraneural bone is elongated and contacts the skull at the forward end.

Species
There are the currently recognized species in this genus:

References

 
Cyprinidae genera
Taxa named by Georges Cuvier